This is a list of electric aircraft, whose primary flight power is electrical.

! Type !! Country !! Class !! Power Source !! Role !! Date !! Status
! Notes
|-
| ΦNIX || Czech republic || Propeller || Battery || Two-seat airplane || 2018 || Project
| Testing and preparing serial production.
|-
| AC Propulsion SoLong || US || UAV || Solar ||  || 2005 || 
| First around-the-clock flight, at night using energy stored in batteries.
|-
| Aerovironment Bionic Bat || US || Propeller || Hybrid || Experimental || 1984 || Prototype
| 
|-
| AgustaWestland Project Zero || Italy || UAV || Cable || Experimental || 2011 || Prototype
| First large-scale all-electric tilt-rotor.
|-
| AirCar || US & TR || Propeller || Battery || Private || 2018 || Prototype
|Electric flying car
|-
| Air Energy AE-1 Silent || Germany || Motor glider || Battery ||  || 1998 || Production
| 
|-
| Airbus A³ Vahana ||US || Propeller || Battery ||Experimental|| 2018 || Prototype 
| 
|-
| Airbus E-Fan ||France || Propeller || Battery ||Trainer|| 2014 ||Cancelled 
| Co-developed with Aero Composite Saintonge.
|-
| Ampaire Electric EEL || United States || Propeller || Hybrid || Four-seat airplane || 2019 || Testing
| Under evaluation by Mokulele Airlines and Loganair.
|-
| Eviation Alice || Israel || Propeller || Battery || Commercial || 2022 || Testing || 2 pilot + 9 passenger, 444 km/h cruise and 1,367 km range 
|-
| Alisport Silent Club || Italy || Motor glider || Battery ||  ||  || Production
| First production electric aircraft.
|-
| APEV Pouchelec || France || Propeller || Battery ||  || 2009 || Prototype
| Development of the Pouchel Light.
|-
| APEV Demoichelle || France ||  || Battery ||  || 2010 || Prototype
| Development of the Demoichelle. The Demoichelle Flew in Le Bourget for the 2010 Paris electric aeroplanes airshow.
|-
| AstroFlight Sunrise || US || UAV || Solar || Experimental || 1975 || Prototype
| First solar-powered flight. The improved Sunrise II flew in 1975.
|-
| Aura Aero ERA || France || Propeller || Hybrid || Airliner || 2021 || Project
| 
|-
| Aura Aero Integral || France || Propeller || Battery || Trainer || 2021 || Project
| 
|-
| Baykar Cezeri || Turkey || Quadcopter || Battery || Experimental || 2020 || Prototype
| eVTOL passenger aircraft
|-
| Beta AVA || US || Propeller || Battery || Commercial || 2019 || Prototype
| Testing and preparing serial production.
|-
| Boeing Fuel Cell Demonstrator (FCD) || US || Motor glider || Fuel cell || Experimental || 2008 || Prototype
| Modified Diamond HK-36 Super Dimona.
|-
| Bye Aerospace Sun Flyer 2 || US ||Propeller||Battery|| Two-seat trainer || 2016 || Project
| 
|-
| Bye Aerospace Sun Flyer 4 || US ||Propeller||Battery|| Four-seat touring aircraft || 2018 || Project
| 
|-
| Cessna 172 electric || US || Propeller || Battery || Experimental || 2010 || Demonstrator only||  On 19 October 2012 Beyond Aviation announced that it had flown an electric Cessna 172 Skyhawk.
|-
| Cessna 208 eCaravan || US || Propeller || Battery || Utility|| 2020 || Prototype 
|Currently undergoing testing prior to certification.
|-
| CityAirbus || Multinational  || Propeller || Battery || Utility|| 2019 || Prototype
|
|
|-
| CityAirbus NextGen || Multinational  || Propeller || Battery || Utility|| 2021 || Prototype
|
|
|-
| DigiSky SkySpark ||  ||  || Fuel cell ||  ||  || 
| Converted Alpi Pioneer 300.
|-
| Dufour Aerospace aEro 1 || Switzerland || Propeller || Battery || Aerobatic || 2016 || Prototype
| Converted Silence Twister.
|-
| e-Genius || Germany ||  || Battery || Experimental || 2011 || Prototype
| 
|-
| e-Sling || Switzerland||  || Battery || Experimental || 2022 || Prototype
| Based on the Sling TSi
|-
| EADS Green Cri-Cri ||  ||  || Battery || Experimental || 2010 || Prototype
| Converted Colomban Cri-cri.
|-
| Electric Aircraft Corporation ElectraFlyer Trike || US || Motor glider || Battery || Private || 2007 || Production
| Ultralight. First commercial offering of an electric aircraft.
|-
| Electric Aircraft Corporation ElectraFlyer-C || US || Motor glider || Battery || Private || 2008 || Production
| Converted Monnett Moni motor glider.
|-
| Electric Visionary Aircraft || France || Ducted fan || Battery || Private || 2017 || Prototype || two-seater vertical take-off and landing air taxi prototype
|-
| Electravia E-Fenix || France || Motor glider || Battery || Private || 2001 || Prototype
| 
|-
| Electravia ElectroLight2 || France || Motor glider || Battery || Private || 2001 || Production
| 
|-
| Electravia BL1E Electra || France || Propeller || Battery ||  || 2007 || 
|  First registered aircraft in the world powered by electric engine and with batteries.
|-
| Electravia Electro Trike || France || Motor glider || Battery ||  || 2008 || 
| 
|-
| AutoGyro GmbH eCavalon || Germany || Rotorcraft || Battery || Experimental || 2013 || Prototype
|-
| ENFICA-FC ||  || Propeller || Fuel cell || Experimental ||  || Prototype
| Converted Rapid 200FC.
|-
| eUP Aviation Green1 || Canada || Motor glider || Battery ||  || 2012 || Production
| 
|-
| Flightstar e-Spyder ||  || Propeller || Battery ||  || 2009 || 
| Converted Flightstar Sportstar Spyder. Also offered as the Greenwing GW280 and Yuneec eSpyder.
|-
| MC15E Cri-Cri ||  || Propeller || Battery ||  || 2010 || 
| 
|-
| Icaro 2000 Trike ||  || Motor glider || Battery || Private ||  || Production
| 
|-
| Joby Aviation S4 ||US || Propeller || Battery ||Experimental|| 2017 ||Prototype 
| 
|-
| La France || France || Airship || Battery || Experimental || 1884 || Prototype
| 
|-
| LAK-17B FES Self-Launch (mini) || Lithuania || Glider || Battery || Commercial || 2020|| Production
| Electric self-launching glider. Aircraft sold since 2016 under temporary Airworthiness Certification (and self-launching not allowed). Full certification obtained in December 2020. Self-launching is now possible, making it a full electric engine with  lithium-battery powered aircraft.
|-
| Lange Antares 20E || Germany || Motor glider || Battery || Experimental || 2003 || Production
|  First electric aircraft to obtain a certificate of airworthiness.
|-
| Lange Antares 23E || Germany || Motor glider || Battery || Experimental || 2012 || Production
|-
| Lange LF 20 || Germany || Motor glider || Battery || Experimental || 1999 || Prototype
| Modified DG800.
|-
| Lilium Jet || Germany || Ducted fan || Battery || Private || 2017 || Prototype || two-seater (5 planned from 2025) vertical take-off and landing air taxi prototype
|-
| Luxembourg Special Aerotechnics MC30E ||  ||  || Battery || Experimental || 2012 || Prototype
| 
|-
| MacCready Gossamer Penguin || US || Propeller || Solar || Experimental || 1980 || Prototype 
| Flown for press demonstration at Muroc Dry Lake (NASA Dryden flight research center adjacent to Edwards Air Force base.)
|-
| MacCready Solar Challenger || US || Propeller || Solar || Experimental || 1981 || Prototype
| Flew  from Paris to England.
|-
| Matsushita / Tokyo Institute of Technology aircraft || Japan || Propeller || Battery || Experimental || 2006 || Prototype
| Powered by 160 AA battery cells.
|-
| Mauro Solar Riser ||  || Propeller || Solar || Experimental || 1979 || Prototype
| First manned, solar-powered airplane. Based on the UFM Easy Riser. Solar cells charged battery for flight.
|-
| Militky MB-E1 || West Germany || Propeller || Battery || Experimental || 1973 || Prototype
| First manned airplane to fly solely on electric power.
|-
| MIT Monarch || US || Propeller || Hybrid || Experimental ||  || Prototype
| Batteries charged by human power. Followed by the MIT Monarch 2.
|-
| NASA Centurion || US || UAV || Solar || Experimental ||  || Prototype
| 
|-
| NASA Helios || US || UAV || Battery || Experimental || 1999 || Prototype
| 
|-
| NASA Pathfinder || US || UAV || Solar || Experimental || 1993 || Prototype
| Developed by AeroVironment, Inc from the HALSOL prototype. Pathfinder Plus had increased span.
|-
| NASA Puffin || US || Personal air vehicle || Battery || Experimental || 2010 || Project
| 
|-
| NASA X-57 Maxwell || US || Propeller || Battery || Experimental || 2016 || Project
| Modified Tecnam P2006T.
|-
| New Concept Aircraft (Zhuhai) Green Pioneer Ι || China ||  || Solar || Experimental || 2002 || Prototype
| 
|-
| Opener BlackFly || United States || Propeller || Battery || Production ultralight || 2011 || Under development
| 
|-
| PC-Aero Elektra One || Germany || Propeller || Solar ||  || 2011 || Project
| 
|-
| Petróczy-Kármán-Žurovec PKZ-1 || Hungary || Rotorcraft || Cable || Observation || 1917 || Prototype
| Tethered to the ground.
|-
| Phoenix U-14 Electra || Czech republic || Propeller || Battery || Two-seat airplane || 2011 || Prototype
|
|-
| Pipistrel Alpha Electro || Slovenia || Light Sport Aircraft || Battery || Experimental || 2011 || Production
| Electric version of the Pipistrel Alpha Trainer.
|-
| Pipistrel Taurus Electro G2 || Slovenia || Motor glider || Battery || Private || 2011 || Production
| 
|-
| Pipistrel Taurus G4 || Slovenia || Motor glider || Battery || Experimental || 2011 || Prototype
| Twin fuselage. The G4 won the NASA Green Flight Challenge in 2011.
|-
| Pipistrel Velis Electro || Slovenia || Propeller || Battery || Trainer aircraft || 2020 || type certified 
| based on the Pipistrel Virus
|-
| Pipistrel WATTsUP || Slovenia || Proof-of-concept trainer || Battery || Experimental || 2014 || Prototype
| Led to the Pipistrel Alpha Electro.
|-
| QinetiQ Zephyr || UK || UAV || Solar || Patrol || 2008 || Prototype
| The 2010 redesign holds the UAV endurance record of over 2 weeks (336 hours).
|-
| Rolls-Royce ACCEL || UK || Propeller || Battery || Racer || 2021 || One-off || 
|-
| Schempp-Hirth Discus-2c FES || Germany || Motor glider || Battery ||  || 2015 || Production
|-
| Schempp-Hirth Ventus-2cxa FES || Germany || Motor glider || Battery ||  || 2014 || Production
|-
| Schempp-Hirth Arcus-E || Germany || Motor glider || Battery ||  || 2010 || Production
| 
|-
| Siemens-FlyEco Magnus eFusion || Germany-Hungary || Propeller || Hybrid diesel-electric ||  || 2018 || Under development for production
| 
|-
| Soaring || China ||  || Solar ||  || 1992 || 
| 
|-
| Solair 1 ||  || Propeller || Solar || Experimental || 1983 || 
| Developed from a Farner canard design.  The Solair II flew 1998.
|-
| Solar Impulse ||  || Propeller || Solar || Experimental || 2009 || Prototype
| 
|-
| Solar Impulse 2 ||  || Propeller || Solar || Experimental || 2015 || Prototype
|First round-the-world trip by an electric aircraft.
|-
| Solar-Powered Aircraft Developments Solar One || UK || Propeller || Solar || Experimental || 1979 || Prototype
| Solar cells charged battery for flight.
|-
| SolarStratos ||  || Propeller || Solar || Experimental || 2017 || Prototype
|First flight in 2017.
|-
| Solution F/Chretien Helicopter ||  || Rotorcraft || Battery || Experimental || 2011 || Prototype
| First free-flying manned electric helicopter.
|-
| Sonex Electric Sport Aircraft ||  || Propeller || Battery ||  || 2010 || Production
| 
|-
| SORA-e || Brazil || Propeller || Battery || Experimental || 2015 || Prototype
| 
|-
| Stuttgart University Icaré II || Germany ||  || Solar ||  || 1996 || 
| 
|-
| Sunseeker I || US || Propeller || Solar || Experimental || 1990 || Prototype
|  The Sunseeker II was built in 2002.
|-
| Sunseeker Duo|| US || Propeller || Solar || Experimental || 2013 || Prototype 
| 
|-
| Tier1 electric Robinson R44 || US || Rotorcraft || Battery || Experimental || 2016 || Prototype
| 
|-
| Tissandier || France || Airship || Battery || Experimental || 1883 || Prototype
| First electric powered aircraft.
|-
| Ultraflight Lazair Electric ||  ||  || Battery || Experimental || 2011 || Prototype
| 
|-
| Volocopter ||  ||  ||  ||  ||  ||  || 
|-
| Volta Volare GT4 ||  ||  || Hybrid ||  || 2012 || Project
| Diesel-electric hybrid.
|-
| Yuneec International E430 || China || Propeller || Battery || Private || 2009 || Production
| Homebuilt aircraft.
|-
| smartflyer SFX1 || Switzerland || Propeller || Serial Hybrid || 4 seater, Proof of Concept || 2021 || Production
| 
|-
|}

References

Aircraft
Lists of aircraft by power source